Henrik "Henke" Nebrelius is a retired Swedish football striker.

University
Nebrelius attended the University of Tampa where he was a 1995 and 1997 NCAA Division II First Team All American soccer player.  In October 2003, the Sunshine State Conference named Nebrelius to its Silver Anniversary Men's Soccer Team.  In 2004, the University of Tampa inducted Nebrelius into its Athletic Hall of Fame.

Professional
On February 1, 1998, the Columbus Crew selected Nebrelius in the second round (twenty-fourth overall) of the 1998 MLS College Draft.  In December 2008, he signed with BW 90 IF.

References

External links
 Succéartad comeback för Henrik Nebrelius 

1974 births
Living people
BK Häcken players
Swedish footballers
Swedish expatriate footballers
Tampa Spartans men's soccer players
Columbus Crew draft picks
Association football forwards